The Coster–Kronig transition is a special case of the Auger process in which the vacancy is filled by an electron from a higher subshell of the same shell. If, in addition, the electron emitted (the "Auger electron") also belongs to the same shell, one calls this a super Coster–Kronig transition.

The Coster–Kronig process is named after the physicists Dirk Coster and Ralph Kronig.

References 

 

Atomic physics

ru:Переход Костера-Кронига